Brian Frederick Schaffner is a political scientist. He is the Newhouse Professor of Civic studies at Tufts University and a faculty associate at Harvard University's Institute for Quantitative Social Science. He is also the founding director of the UMass Poll and a co-principal investigator for the Cooperative Congressional Election Study (CCES), a survey of about 50,000 U.S. voters. He has criticized President Donald Trump for citing a 2014 study based on data from the CCES as proof that voter fraud is widespread in the United States. Of this study, Schaffner told CNN that "Of the people who we were sure were non-citizens, we could not find any who actually cast a vote." He has also said that the authors of the study Trump cited, Jesse Richman and David Earnest, used inaccurate methodology to conclude that millions of non-citizens voted in U.S. elections. He told MassLive.com in January 2017 that "I have been very vocal in speaking out about the study, especially because I feel a sense of responsibility".

Selected works 

 Campaign Finance and Political Polarization: When Purists Prevail, with Raymond J. La Raja. (University of Michigan Press, 2015 ).

References

External links
Faculty page

Living people
American political scientists
University of Georgia alumni
Indiana University alumni
University of Massachusetts Amherst faculty
1975 births